The Virgin Suicides is a 1999 American psychological drama film written and directed by Sofia Coppola, co-produced by Francis Ford Coppola, and starring James Woods, Kathleen Turner, Kirsten Dunst, A. J. Cook and Josh Hartnett. The film also features Scott Glenn, Michael Paré and Danny DeVito in minor roles, with voice narration by Giovanni Ribisi.

The Virgin Suicides is based on the 1993 best-selling debut novel by the American author Jeffrey Eugenides. The film follows the lives of five adolescent sisters in an upper-middle-class suburb of Detroit during the mid-1970s. After the youngest sister, Cecilia, makes a suicide attempt, all of the girls are put under close scrutiny by their religious, overprotective parents. The girls are eventually withdrawn from school and confined to their home, which leads to their increasingly depressive and isolated behavior. As in the novel, the film is told in first person plural, from the perspective of a group of adolescent boys in the neighborhood who are fascinated by the girls.

Shot in 1998 in Toronto, the film was director Sofia Coppola's debut feature. It features an original score by the French electronic band Air. The film premiered at the 1999 Cannes Film Festival and received a limited theatrical release on April 21, 2000 in the United States, later expanding to a wide release in May 2000. The film was met with largely positive critical reception, with both the performances and Coppola's direction receiving note. It was also praised for its lyrical representation of adolescent angst, visual style, and soundtrack, and is now recognized as a cult classic.

In 2015, the film ranked number 39 on Entertainment Weekly's list of the "50 Best High School Movies".

The film marked the beginning of a working relationship between Coppola and star Kirsten Dunst, whom Coppola would cast as the lead in several films in the following years.

Plot
In the sleepy suburb of Grosse Pointe, Michigan, a group of neighborhood boys—now grown men—reflect upon their memories of the five Lisbon teenage sisters, ages 13 to 17, in 1975. Unattainable due to their overprotective Catholic parents, math teacher Ronald Lisbon and his homemaker wife Sara, the girls—Therese, Mary, Bonnie, Lux, and Cecilia—are enigmas who fill the boys' conversations and dreams.

During the summer, the youngest sister, Cecilia, slits her wrist in a bathtub, but survives. Her therapist, Dr. Horniker, suggests to her parents that Cecilia's attempt at suicide was a cry for help, rather than genuine, and she would benefit from wider interaction with her peers, particularly boys. Despite this, Mrs. Lisbon is extremely unwilling to allow her daughters a normal social life. Mr. Lisbon persuades his wife to allow him to throw a chaperoned party intended to make Cecilia feel better. The party, however, is tense and miserable. Cecilia excuses herself and successfully ends her life by leaping from her second story bedroom window and impaling herself onto a spiked iron fencepost below. In the wake of Cecilia's suicide, the Lisbon parents watch over their four remaining daughters even more closely. This further isolates the family from their community and heightens the air of mystery surrounding the girls, particularly to the neighborhood boys.

At the beginning of the new school year in the fall, Lux, the most rebellious of the sisters, forms a secret and short-lived romance with Trip Fontaine, the school heartthrob. In hopes of becoming closer to Lux, Trip comes over to the Lisbon residence and watches television with the family. Trip persuades Mr. Lisbon to allow him to take Lux to the homecoming dance by promising to provide dates for Therese, Mary and Bonnie, and going as a group, to which Mr. and Mrs. Lisbon eventually agree, with Mr. Lisbon chaperoning the dance. After winning homecoming King and Queen, Trip persuades Lux to ditch their group and go for a walk on the football field, where they end up having sex. Afterwards, Lux falls asleep and Trip abandons her. At dawn, Lux wakes up alone and has to take a taxi home, being met by her distraught parents.

Due to Lux breaking curfew, the girls are all punished by a paranoid Mrs. Lisbon by being taken out of school and confined to the house indefinitely. Isolated and increasingly depressed, the sisters contact the boys across the street by using light signals and sharing records over the telephone to express their emotions and share their feelings. During this time, Lux rebels against her parents and becomes overtly promiscuous, having anonymous sexual encounters on the roof of her house late at night with random boys and men; the neighborhood boys spy from across the street. After months of confinement, the sisters begin to leave notes outside for the boys. The girls eventually send a final note to the boys asking them to come over at midnight, ostensibly to escape from their house.

When the boys finally arrive that night, they find Lux alone in the living room, smoking a cigarette. Thinking they are going to help the girls escape, the boys are invited inside by Lux to wait for her sisters, while she goes to start the car. Curious, the boys wander into the basement after hearing a noise and discover Bonnie's body hanging from the ceiling rafters. Horrified, the boys rush back upstairs, only to stumble across the body of Mary in the kitchen who has put her head in the gas oven. The boys then realize that the girls had all killed themselves in an apparent suicide pact: Bonnie hanged herself; Mary put her head in the oven; Therese overdosed on sleeping pills upstairs; and Lux died of carbon monoxide poisoning by leaving the car engine running in the closed garage.

Devastated by the suicides of all their children, Mr. and Mrs. Lisbon quietly flee the neighborhood and are never seen again. Mr. Lisbon has a friend clean out the house and sell the family belongings in a yard sale; family photos and other mementos are put out with the trash and collected by the boys. The house is eventually sold to a young couple from the Boston area.

Unsure of how to react to the events, the adults in the community go about their lives as if nothing traumatic happened, but the boys cannot stop thinking about the Lisbon sisters and why they did what they did. Now adult men themselves, they acknowledge that they had loved the girls, and that the mystery surrounding their deaths will torment them for the rest of their lives.

Cast

Production

Conception
Coppola wrote the script for the film in 1998 after the project was already greenlit at another studio, adapting it from the source novel, of which she was a fan. Another script had already been written by Nick Gomez, but the production company that owned the rights at the time, Muse Productions, was dissatisfied with it. After the rights to the novel lapsed, Coppola pitched her manuscript to Muse executives Roberta and Chris Hanley, the latter of whom signed on to co-produce. Coppola was inspired to write the film after reading the source novel: "I really didn't know I wanted to be a director until I read The Virgin Suicides and saw so clearly how it had to be done," she said. "I immediately saw the central story as being about what distance and time and memory do to you, and about the extraordinary power of the unfathomable."

Casting
Kathleen Turner was the first actor to sign on to the project, playing the Lisbon girls' oppressive mother; Turner had known Coppola after they appeared together in Peggy Sue Got Married (1986). James Woods was cast opposite Turner as the passive father. Woods was given the script by Coppola's father, Francis, and was so impressed by the script and the character's "dark humor" that he agreed to play the role. For the part of Lux, Coppola auditioned numerous actresses, but had a "gut choice" of Kirsten Dunst, who was sixteen years old at the time of her casting. Reflecting on the role, Dunst said: "I was nervous. It was my first role that was more of a 'sexy' thing. I was also unsure about how large the role was gonna be, because a lot of it was without dialogue. When I met Sofia, I immediately knew that she would handle it in a delicate way... [she] really brought out the luminous aspect of the girls; she made them like ethereal angels, almost like they weren't really there."

Filming
The Virgin Suicides was filmed in 1999 in Toronto, Ontario, standing in for suburban Detroit, Michigan, on a reported budget of $6 million. The shoot lasted roughly one month.

Coppola was inspired by photographer Takashi Homma's photos of suburban Japan when choosing the filming locations; "I have always been struck by the beauty of banal details," she said, "and that is what suburban style is all about." The film's occasional use of stills and collages was intended to evoke the "fantasia" of adolescence. Cinematographer Edward Lachman shot the film. Coppola's brother, Roman Coppola, was the second-unit director on the film.

Music

French electronic music duo Air composed the musical score for The Virgin Suicides. Coppola did not want the hits from the 1970s, but rather a "consistent soundtrack" that suited the theme of the film, which led Air to be onboard. She wanted to convey the theme of adolescence in the suburbs in the soundtrack. She found that Air shared many of her suburban memories and experiences even though they grew up in a different country.

Air's score was released on February 23, 2000 by Virgin Records, to critical acclaim and has been considered as one of the "best film scores/rock albums". The film features songs by 1970s-era performers and five tracks from the 1990s by Sloan. A separate soundtrack album was released on March 28, 2000 featuring music from Todd Rundgren, Boston, Heart, Sloan, The Hollies, Al Green, Gilbert O'Sullivan, 10cc, Styx, and two tracks by Air (one previously recorded; one composed for the film). The deluxe edition of the film score was released on June 2015, and a vinyl re-issue was published by Rhino Records in 2020.

Release 
The film had its world premiere at the 1999 Cannes Film Festival on May 19. It was given a limited release in the United States almost a year later on April 21, 2000. The theatrical release would expand to a wide release in May 2000.

Critical reception
The Virgin Suicides received generally positive reviews from film critics, though some noted the film's discomforting thematic material. It holds a 79% approval rating on review aggregator website Rotten Tomatoes, based on 105 reviews, with a weighted average of 7.1/10. The site's critical consensus reads, "The Virgin Suicides drifts with a dreamlike melancholy that may strike some audiences as tedious, but Sofia Coppola's feature debut is a mature meditation on disaffected youth." On Metacritic, the film holds a rating of 76 out of 100, based on 31 critics, indicating "generally favorable reviews".

Jeffrey Eugenides visited the set of the film for three days. He supported the film, but did offer a few critiques in an interview with Dazed. Eugenides envisioned the girls as more of an entity than actual people; he believed this idea could have been accomplished by casting different actresses to play the same character with each actress changing depending on whom they are speaking to.

Graham Fuller of The New York Times gave the film a middling review, writing: "Ms. Coppola has made [...] a haunting metaphysical celebration of adolescence with the aura of a myth. Yet, on the surface, there is something wrong with this picture: how can a film in which a quintet of apparently normal girls commit suicide possibly be a celebration, and why would a filmmaker attempt to make it so unless she is uncommonly perverse?" Kevin Thomas of the Los Angeles Times gave the film a positive review, praising Coppola's direction, the cast, and the production design, but also noting that while the film "is successfully venturesome... you need to know that it's also a real downer." Roger Ebert gave the film three-and-a-half out of four stars, and positively compared it to Picnic at Hanging Rock (1975): "[Coppola] has the courage to play it in a minor key," he notes. "She doesn't hammer home ideas and interpretations. She is content with the air of mystery and loss that hangs in the air like bitter poignancy."

Ed Gonzalez of Slant Magazine noted the film's dreamy, childlike nature, writing: "The narrator speaks of youth as if it existed and still exists in a near-fugue state. In this respect, the film is as much a relevant view of adolescence and male/female relations as it is an act of remembrance. Scenes from the film (first kisses, gossiping about neighbors) are sinewy in nature and seem lifted from the pages of a lost photo album." Critic Richard Crouse called the film "one of those rare occasions when a film surpasses the book it is based on," and included it in his book The 100 Best Movies You've Never Seen (2003).

Home media
The film was released on VHS and DVD through Paramount Home Entertainment on December 19, 2000. On April 24, 2018, a remastered version of the film was released on DVD and Blu-ray via The Criterion Collection, featuring new interviews, a behind-the-scenes documentary, an essay, among other features.

Notes

References

Bibliography

External links

 
 
 
 
 The Virgin Suicides: "They Hadn't Heard Us Calling", an essay by Megan Abbott at the Criterion Collection

1999 films
1999 directorial debut films
1999 drama films
1999 independent films
1990s coming-of-age drama films
1990s high school films
1990s psychological drama films
1990s teen drama films
American coming-of-age drama films
American high school films
American independent films
American psychological drama films
American teen drama films
American Zoetrope films
1990s English-language films
Films about depression
Films about proms
Films about sexual repression
Films about sisters
Films about suicide
Films about virginity
Films based on American novels
Films directed by Sofia Coppola
Films produced by Francis Ford Coppola
Films set in the 1970s
Films set in Michigan
Films shot in Toronto
Films with screenplays by Sofia Coppola
Paramount Vantage films
Poisoning in film
Women and death
Films about dysfunctional families
1990s American films
Films scored by musical groups